The National Football Conference (NFC) is one of the two conferences of the National Football League (NFL), the highest professional level of American football in the United States. The NFC and its counterpart, the American Football Conference (AFC), each contain 16 teams organized into 4 divisions. Both conferences were created as part of the 1970 NFL merger with the rival American Football League (AFL), with all ten of the former AFL teams and three NFL teams forming the AFC while the remaining thirteen NFL clubs formed the NFC. A series of league expansions and division realignments have occurred since the merger, thus making the total of 16 clubs in each conference. The defending NFC champions are the Philadelphia Eagles, who defeated the San Francisco 49ers in the 2022 season's NFC Championship Game for their fourth conference championship.

Teams
Since 2002, like the AFC, the NFC has 16 teams that organized into four divisions each with four teams: East, North, South, and West.

Season structure

This chart of the 2020 season standings displays an application of the NFL scheduling formula. The Buccaneers in 2020 (highlighted in green) finished in second place in the NFC South. Thus, in 2021, the Buccaneers will play two games against each of its division rivals (highlighted in light blue), one game against each team in the NFC East and AFC East (highlighted in yellow), and one game each against the second-place finishers in the NFC North, NFC West (highlighted in orange), and AFC South (highlighted in pink).
The fourteen opponents each team faces over the 17-game regular season schedule are set using a pre-determined formula:

Each NFC team plays the other teams in their respective division twice (home and away) during the regular season, in addition to eleven other games assigned to their schedule by the NFL: three games are assigned on the basis of a particular team's final divisional standing from the previous season, and the remaining eight games are split between the roster of two other NFL divisions. This assignment shifts each year and will follow a standard cycle. Using the 2021 regular season schedule as an example, each team in the NFC East plays against every team in the NFC South and AFC West. In this way, non-divisional competition will be mostly among common opponents – the exception being the three games assigned based on the team's prior-season divisional standing.

At the end of each season, the four division winners and three wild cards (non-division winners with best regular season record) in the NFC qualify for the playoffs. The NFC playoffs culminate in the NFC Championship Game with the winner receiving the George S. Halas Trophy. The NFC champion then plays the AFC champion in the Super Bowl.

History
Both the AFC and NFC were created after the NFL merged with the American Football League (AFL) in 1970. When the AFL began play in 1960 with eight teams, the NFL consisted of 13 clubs. By 1969, the AFL had expanded to ten teams and the NFL to 16 clubs. In order to balance the merged league, all ten of the former AFL teams along with the NFL's Cleveland Browns, Pittsburgh Steelers, and Baltimore Colts formed the AFC, while the remaining 13 NFL teams formed the NFC.

While the newly formed AFC had already agreed upon and set up their divisional alignment plan along almost purely geographic lines, team owners could not agree to a plan on how to align the clubs in the NFC. The alignment proposals were narrowed down to five finalists (each one sealed in an envelope), and then the plan that was eventually selected was picked out of a glass bowl by then-NFL commissioner Pete Rozelle's secretary, Thelma Elkjer, on January 16, 1970.

The five alignment plans for the NFC in 1970 were as follows, with Plan 3 eventually selected:

Plan 1
Eastern – Atlanta Falcons, Minnesota Vikings, New York Giants, Philadelphia Eagles, Washington Redskins
Central – Chicago Bears, Detroit Lions, Green Bay Packers, New Orleans Saints
Western – Dallas Cowboys, Los Angeles Rams, St. Louis Cardinals, San Francisco 49ers
Plan 2
Eastern – Minnesota, New York Giants, Philadelphia, Washington
Central – Atlanta, Dallas, New Orleans, St. Louis
Western – Chicago, Detroit, Green Bay, Los Angeles, San Francisco 
Plan 3
Eastern – Dallas, New York Giants, Philadelphia, St. Louis, Washington
Central – Chicago, Detroit, Green Bay, Minnesota
Western – Atlanta, Los Angeles, New Orleans, San Francisco
Plan 4
Eastern – Minnesota, New York Giants, Philadelphia, St. Louis, Washington
Central – Atlanta, Chicago, Detroit, Green Bay
Western – Dallas, New Orleans, Los Angeles, San Francisco 
Plan 5
Eastern – Detroit, Minnesota, New York Giants, Philadelphia, Washington 
Central – Chicago, Dallas, Green Bay, St. Louis 
Western – Atlanta, Los Angeles, New Orleans, San Francisco

Three expansion teams have joined the NFC since the merger, thus making the total 16. When the Seattle Seahawks and the Tampa Bay Buccaneers joined the league in 1976, they were temporarily placed in the NFC and AFC, respectively, for one season before they switched conferences. The Seahawks returned to the NFC as a result of the 2002 realignment. The Carolina Panthers joined the NFC in 1995.

Parity is generally greater among NFC teams than AFC teams. The only NFC team that has never made a Super Bowl appearance is the Detroit Lions. Since the 2002 division realignment, the NFC has sent 12 different teams to the Super Bowl, whereas the AFC has only sent 8: the Baltimore Ravens (1 time), the Cincinnati Bengals (1 time), the Las Vegas Raiders (1 time), the Kansas City Chiefs (2 times), the Denver Broncos (2 times), the Indianapolis Colts (2 times), the Pittsburgh Steelers (3 times) and the New England Patriots (8 times). The only NFC team to make back to back Super Bowls since 2002 are the Seattle Seahawks.

As of 2021, the only pre-merger team that does not play in its 1969 market is the St. Louis Cardinals, who moved in 1988 to Phoenix suburb of Tempe (they moved to Glendale in 2006). The Los Angeles Rams moved to St. Louis in 1995, but moved back to Los Angeles in 2016. None of the expansion teams added after 1970 have relocated.

With the exception of the aforementioned relocations since that time, the divisional setup established in 2002 has remained static ever since.

Logo

The original NFC logo, in use from 1970 to 2009, depicted a blue 'N' with three stars across it. The three stars represented the three divisions that were used from 1970 to 2001 (Eastern, Central and Western). The 2010 NFL season brought an updated NFC logo. Largely similar to the old logo, the new logo has a fourth star, representing the four divisions that have composed the NFC since 2002.

Television
CBS aired the NFC's Sunday afternoon and playoffs games from 1970 through the 1993 season. From 1994 to 2013, Fox was the primary rightsholder to the NFC's games. In those years, all interconference games in which the NFC team was the visiting team were broadcast on either CBS or Fox. Since 2014, the cross-flex policy allows select NFC games (that involve them playing an AFC team at home or intraconference games) to be moved from Fox to CBS. Since 1990, select NFC playoff games have been seen on ABC or ESPN.

References

National Football League
Sports organizations established in 1970
1970 establishments in the United States